Guglielmo Zorzi (1879–1967) was an Italian screenwriter and film director.

Selected filmography

Director
 The Redemption (1924)
 The Closed Mouth (1925)
 The Golden Vein (1928)

Screenwriter
 Blue Blood (1914)
 The Closed Mouth (1925)
 The Lady in White (1938)
 The Iron Crown (1941)
 Margaret of Cortona (1950)

References

Bibliography
 Vacche, Angela Dalle. Diva: Defiance and Passion in Early Italian Cinema. University of Texas Press, 2008.

External links

1879 births
1966 deaths
Italian film directors
20th-century Italian screenwriters
Italian male screenwriters
Film people from Bologna
20th-century Italian male writers